Kenna Cartwright Park is a municipal park located in Kamloops, British Columbia. The park was created to preserve one of Kamloops' natural landscapes and views. The name comes from the former mayor, Kenna Cartwright.

External links
Kenna Cartwright Park - City of Kamloops

1996 establishments in British Columbia
Kamloops
Parks in British Columbia
Protected areas established in 1996